Meena Bazaar is a 1950 Bollywood film directed by Ravindra Dave starring Nargis and Shyam.

Cast
Nargis
Shyam
Kuldip Kaur
Gope
Om Prakash

Music
All the film song lyrics were by Qamar Jalalabadi and the music was by Husnlal Bhagatram.

"O Mahi O Dupatta Mera Dede" - Mohammed Rafi, Lata Mangeshkar
"Duniyaa Hai Barbaad Dil Ki, Meena Bazaar" - Mohammed Rafi, Lata Mangeshkar
"Paas Aake Huye Ham Door" - Mohammed Rafi, Lata Mangeshkar
"Apna Bana Ke Chhod Nahi Jana" - Mohammed Rafi, Lata Mangeshkar
"Gareebon Ki Kismat Mein" - Mohammed Rafi
"Chod Diya Ghar Baar" - Mohammed Rafi, Shamshad Begum, Om Prakash
"Na Thamte Hain Aansoo" - Mohammed Rafi
"Are Dene Wale Yeh Kya Zindagee Dee" - Mohammed Rafi
"Gori Baahon Me Choodiyan" - Mohammed Rafi, Shamshad Begum
"Aaye Gori Chupke Se" - Mohammed Rafi, Lata Mangeshkar
"Le Lo Ji Maharaj" - Mohammed Rafi, Shamshad Begum
"Suno Buzurgon Ka Yeh Kehna" - Ram Kamlani
"Tujhe Barbaad Karna Tha" - Lata Mangeshkar

References

External links 
 

1950s Hindi-language films
Films scored by Husnlal Bhagatram
Films directed by Ravindra Dave
Indian drama films
1950 drama films
Indian black-and-white films